Neil M. Barofsky (born 1970), a partner in the Litigation Department of national law firm Jenner & Block LLP, focuses his practice on white collar investigations, complex commercial litigation, monitorships and examinerships.  Immediately before joining Jenner & Block, Mr. Barofsky was Senior Fellow at New York University School of Law’s Center on the Administration of Criminal Law, an adjunct professor at the law school and affiliated with the Mitchell Jacobson Leadership Program on Law and Business.  He was SIGTARP, the Special United States Treasury Department Inspector General overseeing the Troubled Assets Relief Program (TARP), from late 2008 until his resignation at the end of March 2011, previous to which he was Assistant United States Attorney for the Southern District of New York from 2000 to 2008.

Education
Barofsky went to Spanish River High School in Boca Raton, Florida and completed his undergraduate studies at the University of Pennsylvania, earning a bachelor's degree in economics from Wharton School of Business. He graduated with honors from New York University School of Law in 1995.

Troubled Asset Relief Program and Special Inspector Generalship

Barofsky was nominated for the job of overseeing the TARP by President George W. Bush on November 14, 2008 and was confirmed by the United States Senate on December 8, 2008, after confirmation was delayed by Senator Jim Bunning.

Until he was confirmed, the role was handled internally by the Treasury Department's inspector general, Eric Thorson, who had expressed concerns about the difficulty of properly overseeing the complex program in addition to his regular responsibilities.

As Inspector General, Barofsky, "[a] life-long Democrat who donated money to the Obama campaign," was viewed as "one of the most impressive and courageous political officials in Washington" for his willingness to "stand up to some of the most powerful people and institutions in Washington or on Wall Street." He "vigilantly fought for his independence as TARP watchdog and has been relentless in his criticism of Treasury officials and especially Tim Geithner." The TARP program money was used to invest in, and in some cases rescue, a number of banks, the automakers GM and Chrysler, the insurance company AIG as well as a number of real estate companies.  The role of the chief watchdog of the government's $700 billion TARP program was to root out and prosecute waste, fraud and abuse. Under Barofsky, the office published 9 quarterly results and 13 audits.

On February 14, 2011, Barofsky sent a letter to President Obama stating that he would resign his post on March 30, 2011, to spend more time with his family. At the time of his resignation, his office had more than 140 investigations underway.  By then, his office charged a few dozen people with civil or criminal fraud, resulting in 14 convictions, more than $550 million in fraud losses avoided, and $150 million in fraudulent earnings recovered for taxpayers.

"[O]ne Treasury official, who spoke on condition of anonymity, was quoted as saying '[H]e's been consistently wrong about a lot of big things." Commentator Glenn Greenwald noted the unnamed official had made the assertion about Barofsky "without identifying a single alleged error," and attacked the "utter cowardice and lack of professionalism needed to produce this passage" on the part of both the newspaper and the official.
Barofsky currently works as a tax compliance watchdog at Credit Suisse

Books
 Bailout: An Inside Account of How Washington Abandoned Main Street While Rescuing Wall Street (2012).

References

External links
 
 
 C-SPAN Q&A interview with Barofsky, September 23, 2012
 Robert Wenzel interviews Barofsky, September 2, 2012
 

1970 births
Living people
New York University School of Law alumni
People associated with Jenner & Block
Troubled Asset Relief Program
Wharton School of the University of Pennsylvania alumni